The Frenchburg School Campus, located on U.S. Route 460 in Frenchburg, Kentucky, was built in 1909. It was listed on the National Register of Historic Places in 1978.

The main six buildings are a gymnasium, the Jane Cook Hospital, a Girl's Dormitory, the school building, a manual training shop, and a teacher's residence. It has also been known as United Presbyterian Center.  It was a medical and educational mission project of the United Presbyterian Church.  The complex includes Colonial Revival, Classical Revival, and Georgian Revival architecture.

References

Colonial Revival architecture in Kentucky
Neoclassical architecture in Kentucky
School buildings completed in 1909
National Register of Historic Places in Menifee County, Kentucky
1909 establishments in Kentucky
Presbyterianism in Kentucky
School buildings on the National Register of Historic Places in Kentucky